Thenjiwe Moseley born Thenjiwe Maphumulo on 29 September 1977 is a South African comedian, actress, Mc and entrepreneur originating from KwaMashu, Durban. Professionally, she is simply known as Thenjiwe. She created and acted in Judge Thenjiwe Khambule and Meet the Khambules which aired on Moja Love. She is a goodwill ambassador for Southern Africa Embrace Foundation, Toronto and Great Impact, Durban. She is also a YouTube content creator and influencer, having been made famous by the sketches she posts on social media.

Early life and education 
Thenjiwe was born on 29 September 1977 in the apartheid era to teenage parents, Thenene Sipho Langa and Nonhlanhla Viera Maphumulo. She was raised in Kwamashu, G Section, KwaZulu-Natal by her grandparents Joshua Bhekokwakhe Maphumulo, a political activist, and Agnes Ntombizodwa Maphumulo, a maid and seamstress.

Because of the political unrest in the country and her grandfather's involvement in the struggle, Thenjiwe frequently changed from one school to another. She completed her secondary education at Northmead Secondary School and later joined Natal Technical College (Natal Teknikon) which is now Durban University of Technology where she graduated in Performing Arts in 1998. After graduation, she waited for casting opportunities in vain because she could not afford an agent or go to live in Johannesburg and so, in 2001, she left for the US, where she lived for two years, working as an Au pair, while studying Business Management at Montgomery County Community College in Pennsylvania. She later relocated to the United Kingdom, living there for 12 years, during which time she studied Law, graduating first from University of London with a Diploma in Law in 2006 and then later a Bachelor of Laws from the London Metropolitan University in 2009.

Career

Lawyer 
After graduating from Law School, Thenjiwe worked as an immigration lawyer from 2010 to 2015.

Comedian 
It was after she and her colleagues had a good day in court in 2013, that they went to celebrate in a pub which happened to host a comedy night-07ijhb. She was dared to perform and she did five minutes on stage and was noticed by a talent scout. She later resigned from her job in November 2015 to concentrate on her comedy career. She got gigs in a few clubs. Her first performance was at Wokingham Theatre. In 2013, she competed in the Funny Woman Awards in the United Kingdom, and the exposure made comedian Celeste Ntuli notice and invited her to be the opening act for her one-woman show, Myself. This opened doors for more opportunities to perform in South Africa. But the five-minute slots she was being offered could not financially justify frequently flying from the United Kingdom.

Having been disrespected as a woman comedian, Thenjiwe decided to use social media to promote her content. 

In February 2015, she joined YouTube, subsequently posting comedy video sketches which made her famous.

Between 2015 and 2016, she appeared as a guest comedian in the Season 1 of Bantu Hour on SABC 2.

In 2016, together with Celeste Ntuli, Tumi Morake, Noko Moswete, Nina Hastie and Tracey-Lee Oliver, she performed in an all-women cast comedy show Bitches Be Back.

In March 2018, she performed at the Magners International Comedy Festival in Thailand, Vietnam and The Philippines. In August, she headlined a show in Eswatini dubbed Laugh Goes On and in December, she performed at the 4th Annual Durban Comedy Festival in South Africa.

In May 2019, Thenjiwe, Mark Banks, Alfred Adriaan and Eugene Khozawas were part of the South African All Star Tour in Sydney and Perth, Australia. Later in the same month she headlined at the Combo Comedy Show Fest at the Carnival City. In June, she performed at the Eswatini Must Laugh comedy show in Eswatini. In August, she performed at the Kings and Queens of Comedy: Women's Day Edition.

One Woman Shows 

 2015 - Laughter is the Best Medicine
 2016 - Born again African
 2017 - Hurricane Thenjiwe
 2018 - From KwaMashu to the World
 2019 - Thenjiwe Live in London

Acting 
Thenjiwe made her debut in acting as Doris in The Road in 2015.

In 2017, Thenjiwe acted in a TV drama series, The Harvest, as Zodwa. In the same year, she acted in two Nollywood movies; 10 Days in Sun City in June and The Accidental Spy in December.

In 2018, she acted as Thenjiwe “Mthandazi” Mvelase, an out-of-work prophetess in Imbewu.

In 2019, she acted in a South African thriller movie, Uncovered.

Hostess 
Thenjiwe has been an Mc at the African Union in Belgium and the Department of Trade and Industry in Pretoria. In 2016, she was a commentator in the countdown show 10 over 10 on  Vuzu.

Personal life 
Thenjiwe married John William Moseley on 5 April 2004. Together, they have a son, Jack Unathi Moseley, born 22 May 2005 in Woking England. She lives with her family in Woking Surrey but frequently travels for shows to South Africa and elsewhere. Thenjiwe is a Goodwill ambassador for Southern Africa Embrace Foundation, Toronto and Great Impact, Durban. Thenjiwe is a Christian.

Filmography

Films

Television

Awards

References 

Living people
South African women comedians
Black British women comedians
1977 births